In the 2013–14 football season, English club Newcastle United competed in the Premier League for the fourth consecutive season. It was its 121st season of professional football.

This article shows statistics and lists details of all matches played by the club during the season.

Chronological list of events

16 June 2013: Ex-manager Joe Kinnear is appointed director of football to widespread objection from Newcastle fans. The Irishman signed a three-year contract with the Magpies.

17 June 2013: Kinnear's interview with Talksport sees him make multiple false claims, including having signed Dean Holdsworth for Wimbledon for £50,000 (it was actually £650,000), sold Robbie Earle, signed goalkeeper Tim Krul and defender James Perch when he was previously Newcastle manager for just over four months during the 2008–09 season, winning the LMA manager of the year award three times (he only won it once), signing John Hartson for Wimbledon on a free transfer (Hartson cost Wimbledon £7.5 million), and to have managed Wimbledon for over ten years when it was only seven. He also mispronounced the names of plenty of people, including managing director Derek Llambias, calling him Derek "Llambiaze".

18 June 2013: Newcastle confirm the appointment of Joe Kinnear as director of football.

19 June 2013: The 2013–14 Premier League fixtures are released, giving Newcastle a tough trip to face runners-up Manchester City, who had appointed Manuel Pellegrini as manager the previous week. On the same day, Derek Llambias resigned as managing director following Joe Kinnear's appointment.

27 June 2013: Defender Danny Simpson leaves for relegated Queens Park Rangers on a free transfer and signs a three-year deal with the west Londoners.

3 July 2013: Defensive midfielder James Perch leaves for Wigan Athletic, another side relegated from the Premier League, for £750,000.

4 July 2013: 16-year-old Olivier Kemen signs for the Magpies for an undisclosed fee from Metz, the French under-17 international striker will play for the Academy and is known as "the new Alex Song".

11 July 2013: Sky Sports and BT Sport reveal their live Premier League fixtures up to the end of November, with Sky picking Newcastle's opener at Manchester City, switching it to 19 August, the Magpies' trip to Everton with that game also being changed to a Monday night, on 30 September. Also on Sky for the Magpies are the first Tyne–Wear derby of the season at Sunderland being put back to 27 October with an unusual 4pm kick-off; the trip to Tottenham Hostpur a fortnight alter becoming a midday kick–off on 10 November; and the home match with West Bromwich Albion staying on 30 November but kicking off at 5.30pm. BT Sport switch two of Alan Pardew's side's fixtures to 12:45pm Saturday kick-offs, against Liverpool on 19 October and Chelsea on 2 November.

16 July 2013: Newcastle win their first pre season friendly 4–2 away to Scottish side Motherwell, who qualified for the UEFA Europa League third qualifying round. Goals from Haris Vučkić, Yoan Gouffran, Moussa Sissoko and Sylvain Marveaux give an impressive Magpies side the victory.

20 July 2013: Newcastle suffer a shock 3–1 defeat to Portuguese club Rio Ave, with Pardew's team 3–0 down at half-time before Shola Ameobi pulled one back for the Tynesiders whilst Rob Elliot saved a Sandro Lima penalty.

23 July 2013: Shola Ameobi scores for the second friendly in succession, this time to earn the Magpies a decent draw with Paços de Ferreira, who finished third in the Portuguese Primeira Liga the previous season, earning them a first ever UEFA Champions League qualifying place. Both sides finished with ten men after an incident between home scorer Rui Caetano and skipper Fabricio Coloccini saw them both ejected with red cards.

25 July 2013: Papiss Cissé finally agrees to wear the Wonga shirt following a row, as he initially refused to wear the shirt on the grounds of his religious beliefs.

28 July 2013: Shola Ameobi scores the only goal as Newcastle beat Blackpool 1–0 at Bloomfield Road.

30 July 2013: Papiss Cissé plays for the first time since agreeing to wear the Wonga shirt and opens the scoring in a 2–0 win at St Mirren, with Mathieu Debuchy also scoring.

5 August 2013: Loïc Rémy joins the Magpies on loan from relegated QPR having turned down Pardew's team in January, becoming the 11th Frenchmen to join the Tynesiders.

6 August 2013: Shola Ameobi scored in the 90th minute to salvage a 1–1 at Rangers after Lee McCulloch opened the scoring for the home side.

10 August 2013: Pardew's team draw 1–1 with Braga in their only pre season friendly at St James' Park with Fabricio Coloccini's header cancelling out Alan's penalty. Before the match, there is a two-minute applauds for Sir Bobby Robson, who appeared on the programme cover as The Football Association (FA) held a national football day for the ex-Magpies manager and to celebrate their 150th anniversary.

19 August 2013: Hours before Newcastle's opener at Manchester City, Arsenal put in a £10 million bid for Yohan Cabaye. Pardew calls it disrespectful after the Magpies suffer a 4–0 thrashing with Steven Taylor sent off, leaving them bottom of the table.

24 August 2013: The Magpies are held to a drab goalless draw with West Ham United at St James' Park as Yohan Cabaye once again refused to play.

28 August 2013: Pardew's team gain victory at the Capital One Cup for the first time in two years, scoring their first two goals of the season in a 2–0 win at League Two side Morecambe. Both goals came late on, from Shola Ameobi and brother Sammy respectively, meaning they became the first brothers to score in the same competitive game for the Magpies.

31 August 2013: The Magpies end their goalless run in the Premier League when Hatem Ben Arfa scores an 86th minute wonder strike to give them a 1–0 win over Fulham.

11 September 2013: Ex-Magpies keeper Steve Harper holds a charity match at St James' Park against an "A.C. Milan Glorie" side which included Paolo Maldini, Franco Baresi and Sunderland manager Paolo Di Canio, who receives a poor reception from the home fans. Meanwhile, Harper's team includes Alan Shearer, Peter Beardsley and Les Ferdinand, and Tino Asprilla had a goal disallowed for offside before the Italians won 2–1 on penalties, but despite this, it was a special night for the fans.

14 September 2013: Ben Arfa and Gouffran score as Pardew's team beat Aston Villa 2–1 to earn their first away win in the league, this was the second year running that a 2–1 triumph at Villa Park was their first league away success.

21 September 2013: Despite Loïc Rémy scoring his first two Magpies goals, putting the Magpies 2–1 at half-time at home to Hull City goals from Ahmed Elmohamady and Sone Aluko gave the Tigers their first away win since being promoted from the Championship, the final whistle brought boos from the home fans.

25 September 2013: Newcastle make it to the fourth round of the League Cup for the first time in two years, defeating Leeds United 2–0 at home, including the first goal of the season for Papiss Cissé in the first half, and a superb effort from Yoan Gouffran in the second. This was their first home game in the competition under Alan Pardew.

30 September 2013: A poor first half display sees the Tynesiders 3–0 down at half time away to Everton before goals from Cabaye and Rémy give Pardew's team hope but the Merseysiders ran out 3–2 winners.

5 October 2013: Two first half goals from Rémy mean the Magpies beat Cardiff 2–1 at the Cardiff City Stadium, despite Peter Odemwingie getting one back for the Welshmen in the second half.

19 October 2013: Before the home game against Liverpool, fans march against owner Mike Ashley's regime. Yohan Cabaye opened the scoring before Mapou Yanga-Mbiwa was sent off near the end of the first half with Steven Gerrard netting his 100th Premier League goal from the resulting penalty. Paul Dummett came on for Moussa Sissoko following Yanga-Mbiwa's sending off and stunned the Reds with his first Magpies goal before Daniel Sturridge's header ensured a thrilling game finished 2–2.

27 October 2013: Despite Sunderland having only picked up a single point from eight games, the Toon suffered their second consecutive Tyne-Wear derby defeat, falling 2–1 to the Black Cats at the Stadium of Light, only the second time the Tynesiders have lost away to their local rivals since 1980.

2 November 2013: Goals from Gouffran and Rémy give Newcastle a 2–0 win over Chelsea, the Magpies' third win out of four matches and second consecutive home victory against the Blues.

10 November 2013: Krul posted a clean sheet with 14 saves, and Rémy scored the only goal of the match as Newcastle defeated Tottenham Hotspur at White Hart Lane.

23 November 2013: Rémy scores for a third game running as the Magpies beat Norwich City 2–1 at home with Yoan Gouffran also netting.

30 November 2013: A Gouffran header and a wonder strike from Moussa Sissoko help Newcastle to their fourth consecutive Premier League victory, beating West Brom 2–1 at home. With this win, the Magpies moved up into the top five for the first time since the 2011–12 season.

6 December 2013: Newcastle take both monthly Premier League awards for November, with Pardew named the Manager of the Month after leading the Magpies to four victories out of four, and clean sheets against Spurs and Chelsea see goalkeeper Tim Krul picking up the Player of the Month award.

7 December 2013: Cabaye scored the winner and Tim Krul posted another clean sheet as Newcastle won 1–0 at Manchester United F.C.'s Old Trafford for the first time since February 1972.

14 December 2013: Gouffran scores in his fourth consecutive home game as Newcastle draw 1–1 with Southampton, with Jay Rodriguez equalising for the visitors.

21 December 2013: Cabaye scores a brace and Hatem Ben Arfa converts a penalty while Danny Gabbidon scores an own goal as Newcastle win 3–0 against Crystal Palace.

26 December 2013: Newcastle thrash nine-man Stoke City 5–1 to move to within one point of European places. Rémy bagged a brace and there were also goals for Gouffran, Cabaye and Cissé.

29 December 2013: Newcastle lose 1–0 at home to Arsenal, Olivier Giroud getting the Arsenal goal.

1 January 2014:  Newcastle lose 1–0 away at West Brom. Mathieu Debuchy picked up a straight red card midway through the second half and in the 85th minute, Tim Krul gave away a penalty which Saido Berahino converted.

4 January 2014: Despite taking the lead midway through the second half, the Magpies suffer their second successive home defeat, falling 2–1 to Cardiff in their opening match of the FA Cup, meaning that Newcastle have now lost three of their past four third round matches in the FA Cup.

12 January 2014: Newcastle are defeated by 0–2 at home to Manchester City. Edin Džeko and Álvaro Negredo scored in either half for the away side. Cheick Tioté had a goal controversially ruled out for offside midway through the first half, despite Gouffran (who was in an offside position) clearly neither obstructing goalkeeper Joe Hart's view, nor making any contact with the ball.

18 January 2014: The Magpies end a run of four losses in all competitions with a 3–1 win over West Ham United at Upton Park. Cabaye and Rémy put Newcastle two goals up, before a Mike Williamson own-goal gave the home side one back. The win was confirmed after a free-kick from Cabaye in the final minute of stoppage time gave Newcastle their third goal.

28 January 2014: Newcastle play out a goalless draw with Norwich at Carrow Road. Both sides finish with ten men, as Rémy and Bradley Johnson are sent off for violent conduct.

29 January 2014: Cabaye is sold to Paris Saint-Germain for £19 million. Luuk de Jong arrives on loan from Borussia Mönchengladbach until the end of the season.

30 January 2014: A bid for the Lyon midfielder Clément Grenier is rejected by the Ligue 1 club.

1 February 2014: Newcastle lose the Tyne-Wear derby for the third time in a row for the first time since 1923, losing 3–0 at home to Sunderland. This is also Sunderland's first double over the Magpies since 1966–67.

3 February 2014: Kinnear resigns as director of football after less than eight months in the role.

8 February 2014: Newcastle lose 3–0 to Chelsea at Stamford Bridge, with Eden Hazard scoring all three goals for the Blues.

12 February 2014: The Magpies suffer their fourth consecutive home defeat, as they are hammered 4–0 by Tottenham. The defeat means that Newcastle have failed to score in seven out of their last eight League matches.

23 February 2014: Loïc Rémy's return from suspension saw him score the Magpies' first goal in five weeks and end their three-game losing run as they beat Aston Villa 1–0 late on.

1 March 2014: Newcastle put four goals past Hull at the KC Stadium, winning 4–1 in a victory that was overshadowed by Alan Pardew's touchline confrontation with Hull's David Meyler, resulting in the Magpies' manager being sent to the stands.

25 March 2014: Academy players Adam Armstrong, Ľubomír Šatka and Freddie Woodman all sign their first professional contracts with Newcastle.

1 April 2014: Another academy player, winger Rolando Aarons, also signs a professional contract with Newcastle.

23 May 2014: Newcastle announce their retained list. First team players Shola Ameobi and Dan Gosling were released, along with Conor Newton, Michael Richardson, Steven Logan, Brandon Miele and Jonathan Mitchell. The club also confirmed that the loan deals of Luuk de Jong and Loïc Rémy have expired and that they would return to their parent clubs.

Club

Coaching staff

Statistics

Appearances and goals
Last updated on 23 August 2014.

|-
|colspan="14"|Players currently out on loan:

|-
|colspan="14"|Players featured for club who have left:

Goals
Last updated on 5 April 2014.

Cards
Accounts for all competitions. Last updated on 5 April 2014.

Captains
Accounts for all competitions.

Players

First team squad

Reserves
The following players did not appear for the first team this season.

Youth team

Transfers

In

 Total spending:  ~ £350,000

Loans in

Out

 Total income:  ~ £850,000

Loans out

Pre-season and friendlies

Competitions

Overall

Premier League

League table

Results summary

Results by matchday

Premier League

FA Cup

League Cup

References 

Newcastle United
Newcastle United F.C. seasons